Gaydar is a 2002 American short comedy film directed by Larry LaFond, written by LaFond and by Terry Ray and Larry Lafond. The film stars Terry Ray, Bryan Dattilo (from Days of Our Lives), Jennifer Echols, and Jim J. Bullock, and also features Charles Nelson Reilly in his last movie appearance.

Production
Gaydar was filmed in West Hollywood, California.

Plot
Randy (Terry Ray) has a crush on a fellow office worker, Jack (Bryan Dattilo). Randy's friend from the next booth over, Frankalina (Jennifer Echols) also has a big crush on Jack, but does not know whether he's gay or straight. Randy comes across a "GAYDAR gun" at a yard sale put on by former partner of Maurice (Jim J. Bullock) which might just put an end to this mystery.

Cast
 Terry Ray as Randy
 Bryan Dattilo as Jack
 Jennifer Echols as Frankalina
 Jim J. Bullock as Maurice's Ex
 Charles Nelson Reilly as Uncle Vincent
 Thomas Cagle as Dewayne
 Rachel Winfree as Mary Kay

Reception
The film has "appeared in over 120 film festivals around the world and won numerous awards."

Awards and nominations
 2003, won Grand Jury Award for 'Best Narrative Short Comedy' at Bare Bones International Film Festival
 2003, won Best Short Comedy Film' at Cinequest San Jose Film Festival
 2003, won 'Bronze Plaque Award'for Entertainment' at Columbus International Film & Video Festival

References

External links
 
 
 Gaydar (film) as originally archived at Wayback Machine - July 11, 2011
 Gay Celluloid

2002 films
2002 comedy films
2002 short films
American LGBT-related short films
Gay-related films
American comedy short films
2000s English-language films
2000s American films